3rd Brigade Combat Team or 3 BCT is a modularized brigade of the United States Army.  It may refer to:

 3rd Brigade Combat Team, 1st Infantry Division (United States)
 3rd Brigade Combat Team, 1st Cavalry Division (United States)
 3rd Brigade Combat Team, 1st Armored Division (United States)
 3rd Brigade Combat Team, 2nd Infantry Division (United States)
 3rd Brigade Combat Team, 3rd Infantry Division (United States)
 3rd Brigade Combat Team, 4th Infantry Division (United States)
 3rd Brigade Combat Team, 10th Mountain Division (United States)
 3rd Brigade Combat Team, 25th Infantry Division (United States)
 3rd Brigade Combat Team, 82nd Airborne Division
 3rd Brigade Combat Team, 101st Airborne Division (United States)

See also
 3rd Division (disambiguation)
 3rd Brigade (disambiguation)
 3rd Regiment (disambiguation)
 3rd Squadron (disambiguation)